The Pará gubernatorial election will be held on 5 October 2014 to elect the next governor of the state of Pará.  If no candidate receives more than 50% of the vote, a second-round runoff election will be held on 26 October.  Governor Simão Jatene is running for a second term.

Candidates

Coalitions

References

2014 Brazilian gubernatorial elections
Pará gubernatorial elections
October 2014 events in South America